Kim Alison Little  (born 29 June 1990) is a Scottish footballer who plays as a midfielder for and captains Arsenal of the English FA WSL. Before her retirement from international duty in 2021, Little was vice-captain of the Scotland women's national team.

Little began representing Scotland at the senior international level at age 16, and helped them qualify for Euro 2017 and the 2019 World Cup. She was one of two Scots selected for the Great Britain squad that reached the quarterfinals of the 2012 London Olympics, and again at the delayed 2020 Tokyo Olympics.

In 2010, she was named the FA's Women's Player of the Year. In 2013, she became the first recipient of the PFA Women's Players' Player of the Year award. In 2016, she was named BBC Women's Footballer of the Year after being nominated for the second consecutive year.

Early life
Born in Aberdeen, Scotland and raised in Mintlaw, Aberdeenshire, Little began playing football at a young age with her father and brother. She played football for her primary school, Mintlaw Primary School and Mintlaw Boys Club as a youth. From age 10 to 14, she played at the youth level for Buchan Girls before joining the Hibernian Girls in 2005. At age 13, she attended and played for Mintlaw Academy. During her time with Hibernian Girls, Little would travel about three and half hours each way from Aberdeenshire to Edinburgh for training. Of her youth, Little said, "Football gave me opportunities from a young age. Having the chance to travel, to play in different environments and to come up against really good players from all over Europe was fantastic and made me more determined to keep playing." Little attended the University of Hertfordshire, where she obtained a degree in Sports Studies while playing for Arsenal L.F.C.

Club career

Hibernian L.F.C., 2006–2008
At the age of 16, Little made her debut for Hibernian L.F.C. of the Scottish Women's Premier League (SWPL) during a UEFA Women's Champions League match against RCD Espanyol at Almondvale Stadium on 8 August 2006. Hibs had signed Little and other players from their youth team to replace veterans Pauline Hamill, Nicky Grant and Debbie McWhinnie who all left the club that summer. In her SWPL league debut, she scored a hat trick against Hutchison Vale L.F.C. During her time with Hibernian, Little helped the club win the SWPL championship title, Scottish Cup, and the Premier League Cup. She competed with the team in the UEFA Women's Champions League twice. During the 2006–07 season, Hibernian won every match with Little scoring 55 goals in her 30 appearances for the club. The following season, she scored 33 goals in 18 appearances with the club.

Arsenal, 2008–2013

FA Women's Premier League, 2008–2010
In March 2008 at the age of 17, Little joined Arsenal in the FA Women's Premier League National Division. She scored her first goal for the club in April, during a 4–1 win over Chelsea before 5,000 fans at Emirates Stadium. Arsenal manager Vic Akers told reporters: "Make a note of this kid, she's going to be a big player." She was not eligible to play in Arsenal's 4–1 FA Women's Cup Final victory over Leeds United on 5 May 2008.

Little played in every league match during the 2008–09 season bar one, scoring 24 goals. Arsenal finished at the top of the regular season table with a 20–1–1 record. She also played in the 5–0 Premier League Cup Final victory over Doncaster Rovers Belles and scored in the FA Women's Cup Final as Arsenal beat Sunderland 2–1 before almost 25,000 fans at Pride Park in Derby. Little later described 2008–09 as her most memorable season, as Arsenal won a treble despite the departure of several leading players to Women's Professional Soccer (WPS) in America.

The following season Little's prolific goal scoring from the midfield helped Arsenal overcome the departure of Kelly Smith. After 47 goals in all competitions, the team finished the regular season in first place with a 20–1–1 record. Little was the league's leading scorer with 22 goals. She was named FA Players' Player of the Year in June 2010. Arsenal entered the 2010 FA Women's Cup Final hoping to lift the trophy for a fifth consecutive year. Despite Little's first half penalty, they were eventually upset 3–2 by Everton, after extra time.

FA WSL, 2011–2013

In 2011, the FA WSL was formed replacing the FA Women's Premier League as the top division of women's football in England. During the 2011 season, Little was the second-leading scorer in the league with nine goals. She scored a brace during a match against Doncaster Belles on 7 May 2011. Arsenal finished at the top of the league table with a 10–2–2 record. At the 2011 FA Women's Cup Final, Little was named Player of the Match and scored the opening goal in Arsenal's 2–0 win over Bristol Academy. After the game Arsenal manager Laura Harvey described Little as "world class."

During the 2012 season, Little was the league's top scorer with 11 goals. Arsenal clinched the regular season title with an undefeated 10–4–0 record and claimed their ninth consecutive English title. During a match against Chelsea L.F.C. on 26 April, she scored a brace with goals in the 47th and 90th minutes helping Arsenal win 3–1. She scored another brace during a 2–0 win against Liverpool L.F.C. on 6 May. Little was voted Women's Players' Player of the Year for 2012–13 by the Professional Footballers' Association, in the first year that the award was given to women. Upon receiving the award, Little said, "For years, I have watched this event on television, so to come here and win the first award is fantastic."

Prior to the 2013 season, Arsenal's head coach Laura Harvey left for Seattle Reign FC in the United States. Under new head coach Shelley Kerr, the Arsenal finished third in the regular season standings with a 10–3–1 record. In her 14 appearances for the club, Little scored three goals.

Seattle Reign FC, 2014–2016

In November 2013, Little left deposed champions Arsenal after six years for American National Women's Soccer League (NWSL) club Seattle Reign FC. Laura Harvey had departed Arsenal to coach Seattle Reign the previous year and had made Little her top transfer target. Of the signing, Harvey said, "Kim is world-class. Her talent and proven experience will be a huge asset for our team in the coming seasons. Having coached Kim for nearly four years, I have no doubt that her creativity and goal-scoring ability will prove an exciting proposition for the NWSL."

During her first appearance for the Reign, she scored a brace against the Boston Breakers helping Seattle win 3–0. After scoring a league-high four goals during the month of April helping the Reign go undefeated in four games, she was named NWSL Player of the Month. She became the first player in the history of the league to be named Player of the Month twice after earning the honour for the month of May. Her five consecutive games with goals scored during the month tied the league record previously set by Abby Wambach during the previous season. She was named Player of the Month for a third time for the month of July after her three goals and four assists in six games helped Seattle secure a 4–1–1 record and clinch the 2014 NWSL Shield (regular season title) several weeks before the end of the season. The Reign finished the regular season with a 16–2–6 record and 54 points – 13 points ahead of the second place team, FC Kansas City. During the team's playoff semi-final match against Washington Spirit, Little scored one goal helping the Reign win 2–1 and advance to the championship final against FC Kansas City. The team was defeated by Kansas City 2–1. Little was named league MVP in her first season with the club. Her 16 goals during the regular season also earned her the league's Golden Boot award. Her seven assists tied for second highest in the league.

After returning to the Reign for the 2015 season, Little was the team's leading scorer with 10 goals (second in the league following Crystal Dunn with 15). Her seven assists ranked first in the league. The Reign finished the regular season in first place clinching the NWSL Shield for the second consecutive time. After advancing to the playoffs, Seattle faced fourth-place team Washington Spirit and won 3–0, advancing to the championship final. Seattle was ultimately defeated 1–0 by FC Kansas City during the championship final in Portland. Little, along with teammates Lauren Barnes, Beverly Yanez, and Jess Fishlock, were named to the NWSL Best XI team.

During the first few months of the 2016 season, a number of offensive players became unavailable due to injury including Manon Melis, Jess Fishlock and Megan Rapinoe. During the team's second game of the season, Little served two assists and scored a goal in the 79th minute to secure a 3–0 win against the Boston Breakers. The following week, she scored the lone goal of the match against FC Kansas City. Little finished the regular season with six goals and two assists. Seattle finished the regular season in fifth place with a  record, narrowly missing a playoff spot by two points.

On 17 October 2016, Little announced that she would return to Arsenal L.F.C ahead of the 2017–18 FA WSL season. Harvey said Little was given an "incredible offer" of a multi-year contract, though no other details were disclosed.

Melbourne City FC (loan), 2015–2016

In October 2015, it was announced that Little had signed with Australian W-League team Melbourne City along with Seattle Reign FC teammate Jess Fishlock on loan for the 2015–16 season. On 9 November, she was named the league's Player of the Match after her first start for the club following international duty for Scotland. Little ended the season having played 12 games for Melbourne City and scoring 9 goals, ranking only behind Larissa Crummer. Melbourne City won both the regular season and Grand Final. Little earned Player of the Match Award honours in the grand final.

On 4 February, Little announced that she would not return to Melbourne City for the 2016–2017 season, saying her time in the W-League was "a one year thing for me" and citing other priorities in October 2016, which she later announced as her transfer from Seattle Reign FC to Arsenal L.F.C.

Return to Arsenal, 2017–present
In May 2017, Little sustained a rupture to her cruciate ligament during training with Arsenal, missing the better part of the season. On 14 March 2018, in the FA WSL Continental Tyres Cup final, Arsenal defeated Manchester City 1–0 to claim their fifth title.

Little suffered a fracture to a fibula during a 5–0 win against Chelsea in October 2018. The match officials were criticised for failing to send off Chelsea's Drew Spence, whose "heavy tackle" had injured Little. It was estimated that the injury would prevent her from playing for 10 weeks. Arsenal won the 2018–19 Super League, their first league championship in seven years.

Little signed a new contract with Arsenal in August 2019. She underwent surgery on an injured foot in February 2020.

OL Reign (loan), 2022
Little returned to former club OL Reign on a short-term loan in June 2022.

International career

Scotland

Little made her debut for the Scotland women's national football team in February 2007 at the age of 16 in a match against Japan, coming in as a second-half substitute for Megan Sneddon. National coach Anna Signeul had no hesitation in promoting Little into the senior team at 16: "Kim is an exceptional talent. There's no limit to how far she can progress. She has technique, speed and power, and she reads the game extremely well." She scored her first international goal as Scotland lost to Russia in March 2008.

During her 50th cap, Little scored the game-opening goal in Scotland's 2–0 victory against rival England at the Cyprus Cup in March 2011. It was only the second time Scotland had ever defeated their rivals, and was the first time since 1977 – 13 years before Little was born.

On 16 June 2012, Little scored Scotland's first hat trick during the team's 8–0 win against Israel. In October 2012, she scored in both legs of Scotland's UEFA Women's Euro 2013 qualifying play-off against Spain. In the second leg Verónica Boquete scored in injury time of extra time to make the score 3–2 to Spain and eliminate the Scots, who were left "utterly disconsolate" at missing out on qualification for their first ever final tournament.

In February 2013, Little scored Scotland's only goal during a friendly match against the United States in which the U.S. won 4–1. During the 2013 Cyprus Cup, Little scored a goal and served an assist in Scotland's 4–4 draw against England during the group stage of the tournament. She scored another goal in the 11th minute of the team's fifth place match against the Netherlands resulting in a 1–0 win for Scotland.

Little missed UEFA Women's Euro 2017 due to her serious injury. After recovering from the injury, she helped Scotland qualify for the 2019 FIFA Women's World Cup, their first appearance in a world finals. Little scored one of the goals in a key win against Switzerland during qualification.

During the build-up to the 2019 World Cup, Little scored in a 1–0 friendly win against Brazil. At 2019 World Cup, she scored the opening goal of the 3–3 draw with Argentina. Scotland

In their first game after the World Cup, a Euro 2021 qualifying match with Cyprus, Little scored five goals in an 8–0 win for Scotland.

On 1 September 2021, Little announced her retirement from the Scottish national team. She made a total of 140 appearances and scored 59 goals for Scotland.

Great Britain Olympic team

Despite opposition from Scottish Football Association with regard to Scottish players playing on a British team, Little was in favour of participating in the Great Britain team at the 2012 London Olympics: "I don't see why anyone would want to stop a player from playing at a massive tournament like the Olympics, it's the biggest sporting event ever. If I get the opportunity I'll grab it with both hands – I would definitely play."

Little was called up to the 18-player squad, one of only two non-English players chosen by team manager Hope Powell, the other being fellow Scot Ifeoma Dieke. Little chose not to sing the national anthem of the United Kingdom before the team's first competitive game, a 1–0 win against New Zealand. The Daily Telegraph newspaper reported that the British Olympic Association were angered by this. Hope Powell said she was not concerned, as some players prefer not to interrupt their pre-match preparation by singing the anthem. Two male Welsh footballers also made personal decisions to not sing the anthem.

Little provided two assists in the team's second group stage match, a 3–0 win against Cameroon. After winning all three matches and finishing at the top of the table for Group E in the group stage of the tournament, Great Britain advanced to the quarter finals where they faced Canada in front of 28,828 spectators at City of Coventry Stadium. Little started the match and played for 82 minutes, but Great Britain lost 2–0 and were knocked out of the tournament.

Little was one of two Scots selected by Great Britain for the 2020 Summer Olympics, which were delayed until 2021 due to the COVID-19 pandemic. Great Britain again reached the quarter-final of the Olympic tournament, where they lost 4–3 to Australia.

Style of play
Little typically plays as the advanced midfielder in Laura Harvey's 4–3–3 formation, but occupies a deeper role when playing for Scotland. In an interview with FIFA.com in July 2012, Little said: "Nearly all my goals come from midfield. That's my natural position. But I'm a player who always tries to make forward runs, be positive and to create and score goals."

Personal life
Little confirmed in an interview in 2014 that she had been in a long-term relationship with professional footballer Tom Pett. In 2016, she appeared in a national campaign for Athlete Ally.

Career statistics

Club

International

Scores and results list Scotland's goal tally first, score column indicates score after each Little goal.

Honours
Little was appointed Member of the Order of the British Empire (MBE) in the 2023 New Year Honours for services to association football.

Hibernian L.F.C.
 SWPL championship: 2006–07
 Scottish Women's Cup: 2006–07
 Premier League Cup: 2006–07

Arsenal W.F.C.
 Premier League championship: 2008–09, 2009–10
 FA Women's Super League: 2011, 2012, 2018–19 
 FA Cup: 2008–09, 2010–11, 2012–13; runners-up: 2017–18, 2020–21
 Premier League Cup: 2008–09
 WSL Cup / FA Women's League Cup: 2011, 2012, 2013, 2017–18, 2022–23; runners-up: 2018–19, 2019–20

Seattle Reign FC
 NWSL Championship Runners Up: 2014, 2015
 NWSL Shield (regular season winners): 2014, 2015

Melbourne City FC
 W-League Champions (Grand Final winners): 2015–16
 W-League Premiers (regular season winners): 2015–16

Individual
 BBC Women's Footballer of the Year: 2016 (winner), 2015 (nominee)
 PFA Women's Players' Player of the Year: 2013
 PFA Team of the Year: 2018–19, 2019–20, 2021–22
 FA Women's Player of the Year: 2010
 FA Women's Cup Final Player of the Match: 2011
 NWSL Most Valuable Player: 2014
 NWSL Golden Boot: 2014
 NWSL Best XI: 2014, 2015
 NWSL Second XI: 2016
 NWSL Player of the Month: April 2014, May 2014, June 2014, June 2015
 NWSL Player of the Week: Week 19 (2015), Week 2 (2016), Week 3 (2016)
 W-League Player of Grand Final award: 2016

See also
 List of women's footballers with 100 or more caps
 Scottish FA Women's International Roll of Honour
 List of Seattle Reign FC players

References

Further reading
 Caudwell, Jayne (2011), Women's Football in the UK: Continuing with Gender Analyses, Routledge, 
 Grainey, Timothy (2012), Beyond Bend It Like Beckham: The Global Phenomenon of Women's Soccer, University of Nebraska Press, 
 Scraton, S., Magee, J., Caudwell, J. (2008), Women, Football and Europe: Histories, Equity and Experience (Ifi) (Vol 1), Meyer & Meyer Fachverlag und Buchhandel GmbH, 
 Smith, Kelly (2012), Footballer: My Story, Transworld, 
 Stewart, Barbara (2012), Women's Soccer: The Passionate Game, Greystone Books, 
 Williams, Jean (2003), A Game for Rough Girls?: A History of Women's Football in Britain, Routledge,

External links

 
 
 Arsenal player profile
 Seattle Reign video profile
 

1990 births
Living people
Scottish women's footballers
Scotland women's international footballers
Expatriate soccer players in Australia
Arsenal W.F.C. players
Hibernian W.F.C. players
FA Women's National League players
Footballers from Aberdeenshire
Women's Super League players
Olympic footballers of Great Britain
OL Reign players
Melbourne City FC (A-League Women) players
National Women's Soccer League players
A-League Women players
Women's association football midfielders
FIFA Century Club
Footballers at the 2012 Summer Olympics
2019 FIFA Women's World Cup players
Footballers at the 2020 Summer Olympics
Scottish expatriate sportspeople in Australia
Scottish expatriate sportspeople in the United States
Scottish expatriate women's footballers
Alumni of the University of Hertfordshire
Members of the Order of the British Empire
Association footballers' wives and girlfriends